Megalepthyphantes is a genus of dwarf spiders that was first described by J. Wunderlich in 1994.

Species
 it contains seventeen species:
Megalepthyphantes auresensis Bosmans, 2006 – Algeria
Megalepthyphantes bkheitae (Bosmans & Bouragba, 1992) – Algeria
Megalepthyphantes brignolii Tanasevitch, 2014 – Morocco
Megalepthyphantes camelus (Tanasevitch, 1990) – Iran, Azerbaijan
Megalepthyphantes collinus (L. Koch, 1872) – Europe
Megalepthyphantes globularis Tanasevitch, 2011 – Turkey
Megalepthyphantes hellinckxorum Bosmans, 2006 – Algeria
Megalepthyphantes kandahar Tanasevitch, 2009 – Afghanistan
Megalepthyphantes kronebergi (Tanasevitch, 1989) – Iran, Kazakhstan to China
Megalepthyphantes kuhitangensis (Tanasevitch, 1989) – Israel, Central Asia, China
Megalepthyphantes lydiae Wunderlich, 1994 – Greece
Megalepthyphantes minotaur Tanasevitch & Wunderlich, 2015 – Greece (Crete)
Megalepthyphantes nebulosoides (Wunderlich, 1977) – Iran, Central Asia
Megalepthyphantes nebulosus (Sundevall, 1830) (type) – North America, Europe, Turkey, Caucasus, Russia (European to Far East)
Megalepthyphantes pseudocollinus Saaristo, 1997 – Europe, Russia (Europe to West Siberia), Caucasus, Turkey, Iran
Megalepthyphantes turkestanicus (Tanasevitch, 1989) – Turkmenistan, Afghanistan, China
Megalepthyphantes turkeyensis Tanasevitch, Kunt & Seyyar, 2005 – Cyprus, Turkey

See also
 List of Linyphiidae species (I–P)

References

Araneomorphae genera
Linyphiidae
Spiders of Africa
Spiders of Asia